Ingrid Roxana Rodríguez Alvarado (born 24 November 1991) is an Ecuadorian professional footballer. She was part of the Ecuadorian squad for the 2015 FIFA Women's World Cup.

International career
Rodríguez represented Ecuador at the 2008 South American U-17 Women's Championship.

References

External links
 
 Profile  at FEF
 

1991 births
Living people
Women's association football defenders
Ecuadorian women's footballers
Sportspeople from Guayaquil
Ecuador women's international footballers
2015 FIFA Women's World Cup players
Pan American Games competitors for Ecuador
Footballers at the 2015 Pan American Games
L.D.U. Quito Femenino players
Ecuadorian women's futsal players
21st-century Ecuadorian women